John Stockton de Martelly (1903–1979) was a lithographer, etcher, painter, illustrator, teacher and writer.

Early life 
John de Martelly was born in 1903 in Philadelphia and studied at the Pennsylvania Academy of Fine Arts, in Florence, Italy, as well as the Royal College of Art in London. In the 1930s and 1940s, he taught printmaking at the Kansas City Art Institute to the same students who studied painting with Thomas Hart Benton.

Works 
De Martelly became a close friend of Benton, and was influenced by his Regionalist style. When Benton was fired from the Art Institute, the Board of Governors offered de Martelly Benton's job as head of the Painting Department. De Martelly was furious and quit.  De Martelly's lithographs, sold through the Associated American Artists Galleries in New York in the 1930s and 1940s, captured the essence of the rural American landscape.

In 1943, de Martelly began teaching at Michigan State University in East Lansing, where he was named artist-in-residence in 1946. By the late 1940s, de Martelly abandoned Regionalism for Abstract Expressionism and closely studied Daumier.

Death 
He died in 1979.

Collections
Detroit Institute of Arts
Fine Arts Museums of San Francisco
Kalamazoo Institute of Arts, Michigan
Kresge Art Museum, East Lansing, Michigan
Nelson-Atkins Museum of Art, Kansas City, Kansas
Smithsonian American Art Museum

References

 The Artists Bluebook.  Lonnie Pierson Dunbar, editor. March 2005.
 Davenport's Art Reference. Ray Davenport. 2005.
 Who Was Who in American Art.  Peter Hastings Falk (editor). 1999
 Kansas City Regional Art.  Associated American Artists. New York. 1940

1903 births
1980 deaths
20th-century American painters
American male painters
Modern painters
Artists from Philadelphia
Kansas City Art Institute alumni
20th-century American printmakers
20th-century American male artists